Eupithecia aphanes is a moth in the family Geometridae. It is found in Australia.

References

External links
 Eupithecia aphanes at the Atlas of Living Australia

Moths described in 1941
aphanes
Moths of Australia